Sam Crome (born 16 December 1993) is an Australian cyclist, who currently rides for UCI Continental team .

Career
Crowe was born in Bendigo.

In 2016, Crome joined UCI Continental team  and won the eighth and final stage of the Tour of Japan.

Crome won the second stage at the 2017 New Zealand Cycle Classic. He also won the mountain classification at the Tour of Hainan.

In 2018, Crome won the fourth and final stage at the Herald Sun Tour.

Major results

2015
 10th Road race, Oceania Under-23 Road Championships
2016
 1st Stage 8 Tour of Japan
 6th The REV Classic
 10th Road race, Oceania Road Championships
2017
 1st Mountains classification Tour of Hainan
 5th Overall New Zealand Cycle Classic
1st Stage 2
 5th Hong Kong Challenge
2018
 4th Overall Tour of China I
 6th Overall Tour of Japan
 7th Overall Herald Sun Tour
1st Stage 4
2019
 2nd Overall Tour de Hokkaido
 5th Overall Tour de Kumano
 6th Overall Tour of Japan
 7th Overall Tour de Langkawi

References

External links

1993 births
Living people
Australian male cyclists
20th-century Australian people
21st-century Australian people